Cry for Me, Billy (also known as Count Your Bullets) is a 1972 American Western film directed by William A. Graham and starring Cliff Potts and Maria Potts. It was one of the first films from Brut Productions.

Plot

Hardened gunslinger Billy is tired of violence and bloodshed. After encountering and giving water to a group of Apache prisoners under the care of a racist US Army sergeant and his men, Billy speaks with a friend about a possible job position far from there. When out, he discovers that all the Indians were murdered save for one girl taken as sex slave for the soldiers.

Billy follows the soldiers in search of the girl that he wants to save, finding that she escaped on her own. After earning her trust, both Billy and the Indian girl named Flower travel together. They come across a cabin where Billy avoids an ambush by the owner and his son, keeping them both at hand with his shotgun. Decided to take some goods from the cabin, the owners offer to sell what he wants for money or in exchange for sex with Flower, to which he reacts angrily, forcing them to run.

Billy and Flower keep their march together in the wilderness using only Billy's horse, until they found a wild horse that Billy domesticates. They fall in love soon after and make love. Then they are found by the Sergeant and his men who were alerted of their whereabouts by the cabin owners. They beat up Billy and tie him to a trunk, kill the wild horse, gang-rape Flower, and steal the remaining horse.

After they leave, Flower releases Billy from his bindings, but when he separates from her for a few moments, she kills herself. Heartbroken, Billy buries Flower and searches for vengeance.

Billy follows the soldiers, ambushing them in the middle of the night and killing them. After that he returns to the town, willing to take the job his friend offered him in order to leave forever the gunslinger life. While leaving the place, he is shot by the owners of the cabin. In the final credits the footage alongside the lyrics of the song imply that he and Flower are living together in heaven.

Cast
Cliff Potts as Billy
Maria Potts as Flower 
Harry Dean Stanton as Luke Todd
Don Wilbanks as Sergeant
Woody Chambliss as Prospector
James Gammon as Amos

See also
 List of American films of 1972

References

External links

Count Your Bullets at TCMDB

1972 films
American Western (genre) films
Warner Bros. films
1972 Western (genre) films
Films about Native Americans
American rape and revenge films
Films directed by William Graham (director)
Films scored by Richard Markowitz
1970s English-language films
1970s American films